Skeleton is a winter sport featured in the Winter Olympics where the competitor rides head-first and prone (lying face down) on a flat sled.  It is normally run on an ice track that allows the sled to gain speed by gravity.  It was first contested at the 1928 Winter Olympics in St. Moritz and again in 1948 Winter Olympics, after which it was discontinued as an Olympic sport.  

In October 1999, the International Olympic Committee  (IOC) added the discipline to the 2002 Salt Lake City Olympics sports program, with both men's and women's events, and has been held in each Winter Olympic competition since. In June 2022, the IOC added a third event, the mixed team, to the sports program at the 2026 Winter Olympics.
 
Skeleton is so-named as the first metal sleds introduced in 1892 were said to resemble a human skeleton. The sport is similar to, but not to be confused with, luge, another form of sled racing where the competitor rides on the back and feet-first.  Often using the same courses, the racing physics are not identical.

Events

Medal table  

Sources (after the 2022 Winter Olympics):
Accurate as of 2022 Winter Olympics.

Participating nations
Numbers indicate the number of skeleton racers each nation sent to each respective edition of the games.

See also
List of Olympic venues in skeleton

References

External links

 
Sports at the Winter Olympics
Skeleton at multi-sport events